Alexandra Hospital is the abbreviation for the Alexandra Hospital, Singapore.

It may also refer to:
 Alexandra Hospital (Cape Town), Western Cape, South Africa
 Alexandra Hospital (Cheadle), Greater Manchester, England
 Alexandra Hospital (Redditch), Worcestershire, England
 Alexandra Hospital (Athens), Athens, Greece